Harold Brinsley Sheridan De Gruchy (9 February 1881 – 13 August 1901) was an Australian rules footballer who played with Melbourne in the Victorian Football League (VFL).

Family
The sixth son of Thomas De Gruchy (1825-1900), and Catherine De Gruchy (1843-1918), née Casey, Harold Brinsley Sheridan De Gruchy was born on 9 February 1881. He died on 13 August 1901.

One of his older brothers, Bill de Gruchy, played one First XVIII match for Geelong in 1900.

Notes

External links 

 
 Demonwiki: Harold De Gruchy.
 Find A Grave: Harold Brinsley Sheridan De Gruchy.
 Boyles Football Photos: Harold De Gruchy.

1881 births
1901 deaths
Australian rules footballers from Melbourne
Melbourne Football Club players
Burials in Victoria (Australia)
Australian rules footballers from Geelong